Midgenoo is a rural town and locality in the Cassowary Coast Region, Queensland, Australia.

Geography 
The town is north of centre within the locality. This land is flat (approx 20 metres above sea level) and is used for crops, principally sugarcane.

The Bruce Highway and North Coast railway line traverse the locality from south-west to north, passing through the town. Midgenoo railway station once served the town but now is abandoned. There are also sugarcane tramways in the locality.

History 
The town's name Midgenoo is taken from the Midgenoo railway station and is reportedly an Aboriginal word for a local tree.

Midgenoo State School opened in 1923 but closed in 1933.

References

External links 

 

Towns in Queensland
Cassowary Coast Region
Localities in Queensland